Információs Hivatal, Hungarian for information office, is a Hungarian civilian intelligence agency. The office, known as IH, is involved in all non-military intelligence-gathering operations, primarily abroad.

External links 
 Hungarian IH page

Hungarian intelligence agencies